The Castle River is a river in the southeast of the Wairarapa district of the North Island of New Zealand.

References

Rivers of the Wellington Region
Rivers of New Zealand